RTP Memória ( RTP Memory) is a Portuguese free-to-air television channel owned and operated by state-owned public broadcaster Rádio e Televisão de Portugal (RTP). It is the company's heritage television channel, and is known for broadcasting classic RTP original and foreign programming. It was launched on 4 October 2004.

Since 1 December 2016, the channel is available on DTT.

Logos and identities

2004-2015

2015-present

TV series 

All in the Family (Uma Família às Direitas)
Charlie's Angels (Os Anjos de Charlie)
The High Chaparral
Hill Street Blues (Balada de Hill Street)
Poirot
ALF
MacGyver (On air, weekends since June 2011)
Carson's Law
The Persuaders!
Mission: Impossible (Missão Impossível)
The Saint (O Santo)
Bonanza
Monty Python
'Allo 'Allo
La piovra (O Polvo)
Quick Draw McGraw
Looney Tunes
Upstairs, Downstairs
Knight Rider (O Justiceiro)
Sherlock Holmes
Who's The Boss? (Chefe, mas Pouco...) (On air, weekdays since June 2011)
Space: 1999 (Espaço: 1999) (On air, weekdays since June 2011)
Duarte e Companhia

External links 
 
 RTP Memória Live Stream on RTP Play

Television stations in Portugal
Television channels and stations established in 2004
Portuguese-language television stations
2004 establishments in Portugal
Rádio e Televisão de Portugal
Classic television networks